Gymnosophists (gymnosophistaí, i.e. "naked philosophers" or "naked wise men" (from Greek γυμνός gymnós "naked" and σοφία sophía "wisdom")) is the name  given by the Greeks to certain ancient Indian philosophers who pursued asceticism to the point of regarding food and clothing as detrimental to purity of thought. They were noted to have been vegetarian by several Greek authors. There were also gymnosophists in Upper Egypt who were called Ethiopean Gymnosophists by Apollonius of Tyana.

In Greek literature, they are mentioned in association with the Persian magi, the Chaldaeans of the Assyrians or the Babylonians, the druids of the Celts, and the priests of Egypt. Some  sources claim that famous figures such as Lycurgus, Pythagoras, and Democritus may have met them. They are mentioned by  authors such as Philo, Lucian, Clement of Alexandria, Philostratus, and Heliodorus of Emesa. These reports are thought to have served as models to Cynics as well as Christian ascetics. Many authors have discussed the purported questions by Alexander the Great and answers by the Gymnosophists.

Ancient accounts

The term gymnosophist was used by Plutarch  (c. 46–120 CE) in the 1st century CE, when describing an encounter by Alexander the Great with ten gymnosophists near the banks of the Indus river in what is now Pakistan.

Diogenes Laërtius (fl. 3rd century AD) refers to them, and reports that Pyrrho of Ellis was influenced by the gymnosophists while in India with Alexander the Great, and on his return to Ellis, imitated their habits of life and caused him to found the Hellenistic philosophy of Pyrrhonism.

Strabo (64 or 63 BC – c. AD 24) says that gymnosophists were religious people among the Indians (XVI,I), and otherwise divides Indian philosophers into Brahmins and Śramaṇas (XV,I,59–60), following the accounts of Megasthenes. He further divides the Sramanas into "Hylobioi" (forest hermits, c.f. Aranyaka) and "Physicians".

Philo Judaeus (c. 20 BCE – c. 50 CE), also called  mentions the gymnosophists twice in the course of listing foreign ascetics and philosophers who are, in his estimation, "prudent, and just, and virtuous" and therefore truly free:

In the 2nd century CE, the Christian theologian Clement of Alexandria distinguishes the gymnosophists, the philosophers of the Indians, from the Sramanas, "the philosophers of the Bactrians":

Porphyry in the Peri Apoches gives a description of the Indian philosophers’ diet structured around the distinction between two kinds of gymnosophists: the "Brahmins" and the "Samaneans". The Brahmins are described as theosophoi by descent. They are vegetarians and eat only fruit, yogurt and rice. They are independent from the king and devote all their time to the worship. "Samaneans" probably refers to Buddhist monks from Bactria. They become philosophers by choice and may descend from any Indian caste. When they become Samaneans, they renounce all their possessions and shave the superfluous hair on their body. They live in communities and spend their time in debates about the divine.

Classification

Indian
The philosophical, religious, and tribal identities of the gymnosophists that the Greeks encountered in the 3rd century BC at the town of Taxila in Ancient India were not preserved in the ancient Greek literature, leading to much modern speculation. The following have been proposed as non-mutually exclusive possibilities.

Brahmin
Some sects of Brahmins belonging to Hinduism remained naked, lived in forests, practiced austerities, shaved their heads, ate only fruit and milk and meditated.

Ājīvika
The Ājīvika went without clothes. Their antinomian ethics match those Pyrrho brought back to Greece from his meetings with the gymnosophists.

Brachmanes
The Brachmanes or Bragmanes, who are identified with the Brahmanas of Vedic religion, remained unclothed. Porphyry mentions that they lived on milk and fruits, similar to Vedic Brahmins.

Digambara
Jain Digambara went naked and preached non-violence and were identified as gymnosophists.

Naga sadhu
The Naga sadhus ("naked saints") have been identified with the gymnosophists by some modern writers: they are historically known to carry arms, and learn martial arts which are promoted in their akharas. They move totally naked except for the arms they carry. The Naga sadhus are often called Indian gymnosophists. They are mostly worshipers of Shiva and carry Trishula, swords and even other weapons. They were known for taking up arms to defend their faith.

Shramanas
The ancient Shramanas, who included both the Digambara sect of Jain monks and Buddhist priests, have been identified as gymnosophists by researchers.

Ethiopian
The school of naked philosophers in upper Egypt was visited by the Neopythagorean philosopher Apollonius of Tyana (c. 15 – c. 100 AD) who called them Ethiopian Gymnosophists. Apollonius had met the gymnosophists of India before his arrival in Egypt, and repeatedly compared the Ethiopian Gymnosophists with them. He regarded them to be derived from the Indians. They lived without any cottages nor houses, but had a shelter for the visitors. They did not wear any clothes and thus compared themselves to the Olympian athletes. They shared their vegetarian meal with him.

See also

Gymnosophy
Pyrrho
Bragmanni
Calanus of India
Zarmanochegas
Dandamis
Jain monasticism
Sadhu
Swami
Sramana
Yogi
Brahmin

Notes

References

External links
Strabo on Sramanas and Brahmans
Strabo on Gymnosophists
Livius.org: Gymnosophists

Asceticism
Medieval legends

History of Jainism
Jainism in Pakistan
Greek words and phrases
Hindu practices
Ancient Indian people
Nudity in religion